The SH-07 / T.K.Road is the life line of the Central Travancore.

It is also known as Thiruvalla-Pathanamthitta-Kumbazha Highway. 
This State Highway origins and ends within the Pathanamthitta District.
It covers a total distance of 32.8 km.

It interconnects the townships of Thiruvalla, Kozhencherry and Pathanamthitta. It starts at SCS Junction, Thiruvalla (Main Central Road intersection) and ends at Kumbazha (Main Eastern Highway intersection). Till the 1990s, it was called Thiruvalla-Kozhencherry Road and ended at Kozhencherry (Poyanil Jn.). The first letters of Thiruvalla and Kumbazha forms the nomenclature of the road as T.K.Road

Route description 

SCS junction, Thiruvalla - Manjadi - Meenthalakara - Kattode  - Thottabagom - Vallamkulam Bridge - Nellad - Eraviperoor junction - Kumbanad Pullad (Kottayam - Kozhencherry Highway -SH09- joins - Chettimukku - Nedumbrayar - Maramon - Kozhencherry - Thekkemala junction - Nellikala - Elanthur - Pathanamthitta - Kumbazha junction (joins Main Eastern Highway / SH08)

The T.K.Road connects M.C.Road(S.H.-01) to Main Eastern Highway (S.H.-08). The T.K.Road (S.H.-07) has the richest townships en route. It can also be called as "the N.R.I. Highway of Kerala". Not only the main townships of Thiruvalla and Pathanamthitta, but all the small towns and villages through which T.K.Road passes through are major contributors towards India's Foreign Currency. The diaspora is spread across the world, mainly U.S., Middle East and Europe.  The Highway also has great cultural significance too. The main trunk road to Sabarimala, Kerala's Largest Pilgrim Centre starts from Pathanamthitta.  The annual Christian convention at Maramon is held near Kozhencherry which is on T.K.Road. The traditional Snake Boat race conducted during Onam celebration is at Aranmula which lies near to T.K.Road / S.H.-07. The District Headquarters, Pathanamthitta is connected to Cochin and Northern Kerala by T.K.Road. It connects the South Eastern townships of Kerala to M.C.Road. It is the shortest route to Cochin from Punalur, (the hill town of Kollam District) and in turn from the Tamil Nadu townships Tenkasi and Tirunelveli.

Though T.K.Road / S.H.-07 passes only through the Pathanamthitta District, it connects the district to the neighbouring districts of Kottayam, Alappuzha and Ernakulam. It also connects the Alappuzha and Kottayam districts to the eastern parts of Kollam district

Townships on the T.K. Road / S.H.-07 
 Thiruvalla
 Manjadi Junction
 Meenthalakara 
 Kattode 
 Thottabhagam
 Vallamkulam
 Nellad
 Eraviperoor
 Kumbanad 
 Pullad
 Maramon
 Kozhencherry
 Thekkemala Jn.
 Karamveli
 Nellikkala
 Elanthur
 Varyapuram
 Pathanamthitta Town
 Kumbazha Jn. - Pathanamthitta

See also 
 Pathanamthitta
 Roads in Kerala
 List of State Highways in Kerala

References 

State Highways in Kerala
Roads in Pathanamthitta district